Andrews Geyser is a man-made fountain in Old Fort, North Carolina in McDowell County. The fountain is named for Colonel Alexander Boyd Andrews, a North Carolina native who was the Vice President of the Southern Railway Company and one of the men responsible for the construction of the railroad between Old Fort and Asheville, North Carolina, in the late 19th century.   The fountain was constructed in 1885 with a dual purpose: it was a feature of the Round Knob Hotel, and a tribute to the approximately 120 men who died building the railroad through this particularly treacherous stretch of land, that culminates with the crossing of the Eastern Continental Divide through the Swannanoa Tunnel. The fountain was said to be eye-catching for railroad passengers ascending the 7.5 miles of track and six tunnels that peaks at the top of Swannanoa Gap because it could be seen several times along the route.

The Round Knob Hotel burned to the ground in 1903, and the fountain fell into disrepair. In 1911, George Fisher Baker, a wealthy New York financier and philanthropist who had been friends with Colonel Andrews, funded its restoration. The Southern Railway Company did not grant continuation of the easement for the fountain at that time, so a new, five-sided basin was constructed about 70 yards across Mill Creek, and the piping and nozzle were moved (to the fountain's current location). The Town of Old Fort was given rights to the basin and the pipe that carries the water, and the fountain was formally named Andrews Geyser.

The Town of Old Fort continues to use Andrews Geyser and the surrounding area as a public park. Andrews Geyser underwent extensive restoration again in the 1970s, and was rededicated on May 6, 1976. Signs at the park describe Mr. Fisher's  role in the early 20th century and the role of Old Fort's private citizens in the 1970s in keeping the fountain running.

When in operation, Andrews Geyser shoots water continuously to a height of about 80 feet. Its water supply is drawn from a pond located at the current site of the Inn on Mill Creek, a local Bed & Breakfast. The Inn's property contains the original dam constructed by the railroad in the late 19th century, and the pond formed by the dam with the water of the Long Branch of Mill Creek. A  cast iron pipe runs from the dam, through a hidden gate valve, then underground approximately two miles downhill to the fountain. The water comes out a half-inch nozzle pointed skyward, and the 500 feet of elevation difference creates the pressure that drives the fountain.  Extended dry condition in the area can limit the ability for the fountain to operate continuously. When the natural water inflow rate to the supply pond falls below the rate at which the fountain draws, the fountain can only be run periodically, at best to match the amount of water inflow over an extended period of time.

In 1967, author John Ehle wrote a historical fiction novel called The Road, which is set in the construction of the railroad from Old Fort to Swannanoa, NC in the late 19th century. The novel concludes with the main character (an amalgam of several real people who oversaw construction of the railroad) making a direct reference to the Andrews Geyser: 

In spite of the name, Andrews Geyser is more accurately a fountain and not a geyser.

External links
 https://web.archive.org/web/20090530113756/http://oldfort.org/andrews_geyser.htm 
 https://thelaurelofasheville.com/communities/new-old-fort-memorial-to-recognize-former-slaves-who-built-railroad/
 https://therailproject.org/history/

Buildings and structures in McDowell County, North Carolina
Fountains in North Carolina
Monuments and memorials in North Carolina
Tourist attractions in McDowell County, North Carolina
Buildings and structures completed in 1885